Brachttal is a municipality in the Main-Kinzig district, in Frankfurt Rhine-Main in Hesse, Germany.

Districts 

The Bracht, a tributary of the Kinzig, flows through the Tal (valley) so the municipality got the name Brachttal.

Brachttal consists of six parts:
 Schlierbach
 Neuenschmidten
 Hellstein
 Spielberg
 Udenhain
 Streitberg
Schlierbach is the biggest part of Brachttal and also the most people live there. The administration and the tourist information of Brachttal (Gemeindeverwaltung Brachttal) are located in Schlierbach.

Schlierbach is well known for its ceramic manufacture, the Waechtersbach ceramics.
Next to the manufacture there is a tegut-market, the only supermarket in Brachttal.

In Spielberg and Streitberg there are ceramic museums. In Neuenschmidten is Schloss Eisenhammer and an old big oak with a scope of 7.88 meters (25.853 ft) in 2014. Today the Schloss is empty and it is offered for sale.

The famous Vogelsberger Südbahnradweg leads through Schlierbach and Hellstein. This cycle track is built on a closed railway, the Vogelsberger Südbahn which was a rail connection between Wächtersbach and Hartmannshain.

There is a buslinie to Schlierbach which starts at Wächtersbach station. The bus stop Schlierbach Rathaus is in front of the administration (Gemeindeverwaltung Brachttal). More information is available by the Rhein-Main-Verkehrsverbund.

Politics

Sister cities 
  Rybachy, Russia – since March 2015

Coordinates/Maps of POI
 Administration/Tourist Information of Brachttal (Gemeindeverwaltung Brachttal): 
 Ceramics museum Spielberg: 
 Ceramics museum Streitberg: 
 Waechtersbach ceramics factory outlet: 
 Schloss Eisenhammer: 
 Big old oak: 
 Public kneipp basin:

References

Municipalities in Hesse
Main-Kinzig-Kreis